"Wavelength" is the title song from the 1978 album by Northern Irish singer-songwriter Van Morrison. Released as a single in 1978, it climbed to number forty two in the US charts, and stayed in the Hot 100 for eleven weeks. According to Howard A. Dewitt, this "was the song which re-established Morrison's hit making abilities".

Recording and composition
"Wavelength" was recorded in spring 1978 at the Shangri-La Studios in Malibu, California. 

The most important contribution to the music was made by Peter Bardens who played the 1970s synthesizers.

In his biography, Brian Hinton states that it is, "a love song about the mysterious and unspoken communication between a couple" and also refers to the singer's adolescent years when he would listen to the Voice of America and the sounds of his favorite artists such as Ray Charles singing "Come back baby, come back". In the song Morrison refers to his first solo hit single "Brown Eyed Girl", using the lyrics "Won't you play that song again for me, about my lover, my lover in the grass".

The Allmusic reviewer wrote that, "'Wavelength' makes some nods to its era (1978), most notably and obviously via the use of fat 1970s synthesizers—played by Peter Bardens—which play spacy loops that mimic the interference and bubbling feedback one gets when dialing up shortwave radio stations. It is a little bit of cleverness, as Morrison elicits the same feelings on his own recording that he no doubt had discovering his favorite new music."

Live performances
As performed by the Wavelength band on tour, it was a very popular song.  Morrison assembled the band to promote his album,  Wavelength that was released at the same time.

Acclaim
Record World said that "Morrison's classic jazz/rock style is particularly effective" on this song.

"Wavelength" was rated at No. 253 in Dave Marsh's 1989 book The Heart of Rock and Soul, The 1001 Greatest Singles Ever.

Other releases
"Wavelength" was the opening track on the Live at Montreux 1980/1974 DVD released in 2006. It is one of the songs remastered in 2007and included on the compilation album Still on Top - The Greatest Hits. It was also performed in 1979, on Morrison's first video Van Morrison in Ireland, which was released in 1981.

Personnel
Van Morrison – vocals, acoustic guitar, alto saxophone
Peter Bardens – synthesizer, piano, organ, 
Bobby Tench – electric guitar, backing vocals, 
Mickey Feat – bass guitar
Peter Van Hooke –  drums 
Ginger Blake – backing vocals 
Laura Creamer – backing vocals 
Linda Dillard – backing vocals

Notes

References
DeWitt, Howard A. (1983). Van Morrison: The Mystic's Music, Horizon Books, 
Heylin, Clinton (2003). Can You Feel the Silence? Van Morrison: A New Biography, Chicago Review Press, 
Hinton, Brian (1997). Celtic Crossroads: The Art of Van Morrison, Sanctuary,

External links
[ Allmusic Review: Wavelength song]

Van Morrison songs
1978 singles
Songs written by Van Morrison
Music videos directed by Bruce Gowers
1978 songs
Songs about radio
Song recordings produced by Van Morrison
Warner Records singles